The Italian general election of 2008 took place on 13–14 April 2008.

In Trentino the centre-right came first thanks to the strong showing of Lega Nord, while in South Tyrol the South Tyrolean People's Party was confirmed as the largest party, but lost many votes to its right-wing competitors, Die Freiheitlichen and Union for South Tyrol.

Results

Chamber of Deputies

Trentino

|-
|- bgcolor="#E9E9E9"
!rowspan="1" align="left" valign="top"|Coalition leader
!rowspan="1" align="center" valign="top"|votes
!rowspan="1" align="center" valign="top"|votes (%)
!rowspan="1" align="left" valign="top"|Party
!rowspan="1" align="center" valign="top"|votes
!rowspan="1" align="center" valign="top"|votes (%)
|-
!rowspan="2" align="left" valign="top"|Silvio Berlusconi
|rowspan="2" valign="top"|139,088
|rowspan="2" valign="top"|43.9

|align="left"|The People of Freedom
|valign="top"|86,977
|valign="top"|27.4
|-
|align="left"|Lega Nord
|valign="top"|52,111
|valign="top"|16.4

|-
!rowspan="2" align="left" valign="top"|Walter Veltroni
|rowspan="2" valign="top"|117,508
|rowspan="2" valign="top"|37.1

|align="left"|Democratic Party
|valign="top"|102,359
|valign="top"|32.3
|-
|align="left"|Italy of Values
|valign="top"|15,149
|valign="top"|4.8

|-
!rowspan="1" align="left" valign="top"|Pier Ferdinando Casini
|rowspan="1" valign="top"|20,307
|rowspan="1" valign="top"|6.4

|align="left"|Union of the Centre
|valign="top"|20,307
|valign="top"|6.4

|-
!rowspan="1" align="left" valign="top"|Siegfried Brugger
|rowspan="1" valign="top"|15,054
|rowspan="1" valign="top"|4.8

|align="left"|South Tyrolean People's Party
|valign="top"|15,054
|valign="top"|4.8

|-
!rowspan="1" align="left" valign="top"|Fausto Bertinotti
|rowspan="1" valign="top"|9,374
|rowspan="1" valign="top"|3.0

|align="left"|The Left – The Rainbow
|valign="top"|9,374
|valign="top"|3.0

|-
!rowspan="1" align="left" valign="top"|Daniela Santanché
|rowspan="1" valign="top"|7,370
|rowspan="1" valign="top"|2.3

|align="left"|The Right
|valign="top"|7,370
|valign="top"|2.3

|-
!rowspan="1" align="left" valign="top"|Others
|rowspan="1" valign="top"|8,220
|rowspan="1" valign="top"|2.6

|align="left"|others
|valign="top"|8,220
|valign="top"|2.6

|-
|- bgcolor="#E9E9E9"
!rowspan="1" align="left" valign="top"|Total coalitions
!rowspan="1" align="right" valign="top"|316,921
!rowspan="1" align="right" valign="top"|100.0
!rowspan="1" align="left" valign="top"|Total parties
!rowspan="1" align="right" valign="top"|316,921
!rowspan="1" align="right" valign="top"|100.0
|}
Source: Ministry of the Interior

South Tyrol

|-
|- bgcolor="#E9E9E9"
!rowspan="1" align="left" valign="top"|Coalition leader
!rowspan="1" align="center" valign="top"|votes
!rowspan="1" align="center" valign="top"|votes (%)
!rowspan="1" align="left" valign="top"|Party
!rowspan="1" align="center" valign="top"|votes
!rowspan="1" align="center" valign="top"|votes (%)
|-
!rowspan="1" align="left" valign="top"|Siegfried Brugger
|rowspan="1" valign="top"|132,612
|rowspan="1" valign="top"|44.3

|align="left"|South Tyrolean People's Party
|valign="top"|132,612
|valign="top"|44.3

|-
!rowspan="2" align="left" valign="top"|Walter Veltroni
|rowspan="2" valign="top"|53,924
|rowspan="2" valign="top"|18.0

|align="left"|Democratic Party
|valign="top"|48,613
|valign="top"|16.4
|-
|align="left"|Italy of Values
|valign="top"|5,311
|valign="top"|1.7

|-
!rowspan="2" align="left" valign="top"|Silvio Berlusconi
|rowspan="2" valign="top"|47,966
|rowspan="2" valign="top"|16.0

|align="left"|The People of Freedom
|valign="top"|42,015
|valign="top"|14.0
|-
|align="left"|Lega Nord
|valign="top"|5,951
|valign="top"|2.0

|-
!rowspan="1" align="left" valign="top"|Pius Leitner
|rowspan="1" valign="top"|28,224
|rowspan="1" valign="top"|9.4

|align="left"|Die Freiheitlichen
|valign="top"|28,224
|valign="top"|9.4

|-
!rowspan="1" align="left" valign="top"|Andreas Pöder
|rowspan="1" valign="top"|12,443
|rowspan="1" valign="top"|4.2

|align="left"|Union for South Tyrol
|valign="top"|12,443
|valign="top"|4.2

|-
!rowspan="1" align="left" valign="top"|Fausto Bertinotti
|rowspan="1" valign="top"|9,933
|rowspan="1" valign="top"|3.3

|align="left"|The Left – The Rainbow
|valign="top"|9,933
|valign="top"|3.3

|-
!rowspan="1" align="left" valign="top"|Pier Ferdinando Casini
|rowspan="1" valign="top"|5,380
|rowspan="1" valign="top"|1.8

|align="left"|Union of the Centre
|valign="top"|5,380
|valign="top"|1.8

|-
!rowspan="1" align="left" valign="top"|Daniela Santanché
|rowspan="1" valign="top"|5,067
|rowspan="1" valign="top"|1.7

|align="left"|The Right
|valign="top"|5,067
|valign="top"|1.7

|-
!rowspan="1" align="left" valign="top"|Others
|rowspan="1" valign="top"|3,751
|rowspan="1" valign="top"|1.3

|align="left"|others
|valign="top"|3,751
|valign="top"|1.3

|-
|- bgcolor="#E9E9E9"
!rowspan="1" align="left" valign="top"|Total coalitions
!rowspan="1" align="right" valign="top"|299,300
!rowspan="1" align="right" valign="top"|100.0
!rowspan="1" align="left" valign="top"|Total parties
!rowspan="1" align="right" valign="top"|299,300
!rowspan="1" align="right" valign="top"|100.0
|}
Source: Ministry of the Interior

MPs elected in Trentino-Alto Adige/Südtirol

Chamber of Deputies

Democratic Party
Gianclaudio Bressa
Laura Froner
Maria Luisa Gnecchi

The People of Freedom
Manuela Di Centa
Giorgio Holzmann
Maurizio Di Tenno

South Tyrolean People's Party
Siegfried Brugger
Karl Zeller

Lega Nord
Maurizio Fugatti

Senate
South Tyrolean People's Party
Helga Thaler Ausserhofer
Manfred Pinzger
Oskar Peterlini

The People of Freedom
Cristiano De Eccher
Giacomo Santini

Democratic Party
Claudio Molinari

Lega Nord
Sergio Divina

Elections in Trentino-Alto Adige/Südtirol
2008 elections in Italy